Rannu is a small borough in Tartu County, Estonia.

Rannu may also refer to the following places:

Estonia
 Rannu Parish, a municipality in Tartu County
 Rannu, Ida-Viru County, a village in Ida-Viru County
 Rannu, Pärnu County, village in Pärnu County

India
 Rannu, Uttar Pradesh, a village